The 2011 Emirates Cup of Nations was held at The Sevens Stadium in Dubai as a season ending tournament for tier 3 teams from different continents.  The four competing teams were hosts UAE, Asian 5 Nations rivals Hong Kong, 2011 Africa Cup champions Kenya and South American Rugby Championship A Division team Brazil.

The tournament was Brazil's first 15-a-side games outside of South America.

Hong Kong won the tournament, winning all three games with a bonus point (scoring 4 or more tries in a game).  Kenya finished runners-up, courtesy of a last minute win over Brazil in their opening game.

Format
The tournament is being played as a single round-robin, with the winner being the leading team after the third round of fixtures.  The points for the tournament were awarded for:
Win =  4 points
Draw = 2 points
Loss = 1 point
Scoring 4 or more tries in one game = 1 bonus point
Losing by 7 or less points = 1 bonus point.

Fixtures and results

See also
2011 Asian Five Nations
2012 Cup of Nations

References

2011
2011 rugby union tournaments for national teams
International rugby union competitions hosted by the United Arab Emirates
rugby union
2011 in Asian rugby union
rugby union
rugby union
rugby union
December 2011 sports events in Asia